Rustai-ye Shahid Beheshti (also Romanized as Rūstāī-ye Shahīd Beheshtī) is a village in Jahadabad Rural District, in the Central District of Anbarabad County, Kerman Province, Iran. At the 2006 census, its population was 840, in 183 families.

References 

Populated places in Anbarabad County